Keith Holmes may refer to:

Keith Holmes (boxer) (born 1969), American boxer
Keith Holmes (palaeobotanist) (born 1933), Australian palaeobotanist